Sahle-Work Zewde (born 21 February 1950) is an Ethiopian politician and diplomat who is the president of Ethiopia since 2018, being the first woman to hold the office. She was elected as president unanimously by members of the Federal Parliamentary Assembly on 25 October 2018. 

American business magazine Forbes, on its annual edition of the Forbes list of The World's 100 Most Powerful Women, listed Sahle-Work as the 96th most powerful woman in the world, and the highest-ranking African woman on the list.

Early life and education
Born in Addis Ababa, Sahle-Work is of Amhara origin. She is the first born out of four children. She attended elementary and secondary school at Lycée Guebre-Mariam in Addis Ababa, after which she studied natural science at the University of Montpellier, France. She is fluent in Amharic, French, and English.

Career

Diplomatic career
Sahle-Work was only the second woman to be appointed an ambassador in Ethiopian history (ambassador Yodit Emiru was the first woman to hold an ambassadorship). She served as the ambassador of both the communist People's Democratic Republic of Ethiopia and post-civil war Transitional Government of Ethiopia.

A veteran in the Ethiopian foreign service, Sahle-Work served as Ambassador to Senegal, with accreditation to Mali, Cape Verde, Guinea-Bissau, Gambia and Guinea, from 1989 to 1993. From 1993 to 2002, she was Ambassador to Djibouti and Permanent Representative to the Intergovernmental Authority on Development (IGAD). She later served as Ambassador to France,Permanent Representative to the United Nations Educational, Scientific and Cultural Organization (UNESCO) and was accredited to Tunisia and Morocco from 2002 to 2006.

Sahle-Work subsequently held other high level positions including Permanent Representative of Ethiopia to the African Union and the United Nations Economic Commission for Africa (ECA) and Director-General for African Affairs in the Ministry of Foreign Affairs of Ethiopia.

Career with the United Nations
Until 2011, Sahle-Work served as Special Representative of United Nations Secretary-General Ban Ki-moon and Head of the United Nations Integrated Peace-building Office in the Central African Republic (BINUCA).

In 2011, Ban appointed Sahle-Work as Director-General of the United Nations Office at Nairobi (UNON). Under Sahle-Work, the Nairobi office became a more important UN hub for East and Central Africa, according to the 2012 Africa Yearbook.

In June 2018, Secretary-General António Guterres appointed Sahle-Work as his Special Representative to the African Union and Head of the United Nations Office to the African Union (UNOAU) at the level of Under-Secretary-General of the United Nations. She was the first woman to hold the post.

President of Ethiopia
Sahle-Work was appointed as president of Ethiopia on 25 October 2018, the first woman to serve in the role and the fourth president since the ruling Ethiopian People's Revolutionary Democratic Front (EPRDF) coalition was elected in the newly established Federal Democratic Republic of Ethiopia in 1995. She replaced Mulatu Teshome, who resigned in unclear circumstances, and Sahle-Work is expected to serve two six-year terms.Although her role is largely ceremonial (with most executive power lying with the prime minister), Sahle-Work's election made her Ethiopia's first female head of state since Empress Zewditu. As of 2021, she is one of two serving female heads of state in Africa, alongside Samia Suluhu of Tanzania.
On 25 March 2020, Sahle-Work announced on Twitter that she has pardoned more than 4,000 prisoners in a move to curb the spread of the COVID-19 pandemic in Ethiopia. She also pardoned more than 1,500 prisoners on 2 April 2020.

On 19 December 2020, Sahle-Work commuted the death sentences of former Derg officials Berhanu Bayeh and Adis Tedla to life imprisonment. They had been granted safe haven in the Italian embassy soon after the Derg regime's collapse in 1991 and had been living there ever since. Italy refused to give them up because of its long-standing opposition to capital punishment. Berhanu and Adis had been sentenced in absentia to death in 2008, but were subsequently granted parole on 24 December.

See also
List of elected and appointed female heads of state and government

References

External links

United Nations Press Release

Living people
1950 births
People from Addis Ababa
21st-century Ethiopian women
Ambassadors of Ethiopia to Djibouti
Ambassadors of Ethiopia to France
Ambassadors of Ethiopia to Senegal
Ethiopian women ambassadors
Presidents of Ethiopia
Women presidents
Ethiopian officials of the United Nations
University of Montpellier alumni
Female heads of state
21st-century Ethiopian politicians
21st-century Ethiopian women politicians
20th-century Ethiopian women
20th-century Ethiopian politicians
20th-century Ethiopian women politicians